Damian Swarnowiecki (born 20 December 1993) is a Polish judoka.

He is the gold medallist of the 2016 Judo Grand Prix Samsun in the -73 kg category.

References

External links
 

1993 births
Living people
Polish male judoka
Place of birth missing (living people)
European Games competitors for Poland
Judoka at the 2015 European Games
Judoka at the 2019 European Games
21st-century Polish people